Trechus puetzi is a species of beetle in the subfamily Trechinae. It was described by P. Moravec & Wrase in 1998.

References

puetzi
Beetles described in 1998